Santiago de Puringla is a municipality in the Honduran department of La Paz. The municipality is situated on a plain bordered by the River Puringla. South of the municipality runs the River Lepasale.

History 

Puringla means "Abundance of Pollen" in indigenous languages.

The original name of the community was Alguindia. In 1691, it was founded with the name Puringla and was given the categorisation of municipality in 1886. On 5 September 1921, as an act of celebration of the centenary of Independence, it was agreed to change the name to its current form.

In April 2020, the municipality suffered fires in large parts of Delicias.

Demographics
At the time of the 2013 Honduras census, Santiago de Puringla municipality had a population of 16,182. Of these, 97.06% were Indigenous (96.89% Lenca), 2.71% Mestizo, 0.17% Black or Afro-Honduran and 0.06% White.

Villages 

Santiago de Puringla has the following ten villages:

 Cedritos
 El Higuito
 El Ocotal
 El Rancho de Jesús
 Gualazara
 Hornitos
 Las Huertas
 Las Delicias
 Ojos de Agua
 San Antonio
 Rauteca
 Matazano

References

Municipalities of the La Paz Department (Honduras)